Audrey Marie Munson (June 8, 1891 – February 20, 1996) was an American artist's model and film actress, considered to be "America's first supermodel." In her time, she was variously known as "Miss Manhattan", the "Panama–Pacific Girl", the "Exposition Girl" and "American Venus." She was the model or inspiration for more than twelve statues in New York City, and many others elsewhere. Munson appeared in four silent films, including unclothed in Inspiration (1915). She was one of the first American actresses to appear nude in a non-pornographic film.

Career

Model 

Audrey Marie Munson was born in Rochester, New York, on June 8, 1891, to Edgar Munson (1857-1945), who was a streetcar conductor and Western real estate speculator descended from English Puritans, and Katherine "Kittie" Mahaney (1863-1958), a daughter of Irish immigrants. Her father was from Mexico, New York, and she later lived there. Her parents divorced when she was eight, and Audrey and her mother moved to Providence, Rhode Island.

In 1909 the pair moved to Washington Heights in New York City, where the 17-year-old Audrey sought a career as an actress and chorus girl. Her first role on Broadway was as a "footman" in The Boy and The Girl at the Aerial Gardens of the New Amsterdam Theatre, which ran from May 31 – June 19, 1909. She also appeared in The Girl and the Wizard, Girlies and La Belle Paree.

While window-shopping on Fifth Avenue with her mother she was spotted by photographer Felix Benedict Herzog, who asked her to pose for him at his studio in the Lincoln Arcade Building on Broadway and 65th Street. Herzog introduced her to his friends in the art world. She posed for muralist William de Leftwich Dodge, who gave her a letter of introduction to Isidore Konti. Konti was her first sculptor, and her first nude modeling. From this point Munson would pose for a few well-known visual artists, including painter Francis Coates Jones, illustrators Harrison Fisher, Archie Gunn, and Charles Dana Gibson, and photographers Herzog and Arnold Genthe, but she was predominantly a sculptors' model.

Munson's first acknowledged credit is Konti's marble statuary called Three Graces unveiled in the new Grand Ballroom at the Hotel Astor in Times Square in September 1909. She posed for all three graces.  Soon after, and for the next decade, Munson became the model of choice for the first tier of American sculptors, posing for a long list of freestanding statuary, monuments, and allegorical architectural sculpture on state capitols and other major public buildings.  According to The Sun in 1913, "Over a hundred artists agree that if the name of Miss Manhattan belongs to anyone in particular it is to this young woman."  By 1915, she was so well established that she became Alexander Stirling Calder's model of choice, when he became Director of Sculpture for the Panama–Pacific International Exposition held in San Francisco that year. Her figure was "ninety times repeated against the sky" on one building alone, atop the colonnades of the Court of the Universe, roughly modeled on St. Peter's Square in the Vatican. In fact, Munson posed for three-fifths of the sculpture created for the event and earned fame as the "Panama–Pacific Girl".

Film actress 

Munson's newfound celebrity helped launch her career in the nascent film industry and she starred in four silent films. In the first, Inspiration (1915), made by the Thanhouser Film Corporation in New Rochelle, New York and directed by George Foster Platt, she appeared fully nude in a story of a sculptor's model. The censors were reluctant to ban the film, fearing they would also have to ban Renaissance art. Munson's films were a box office success, although the critics were divided. Thanhouser hired a lookalike named Jane Thomas to do Munson's acting scenes, while Munson did the scenes where she posed nude. Although Munson's appearance in Inspiration is sometimes said to be the first occasion of an American actress appearing nude in a non-pornographic film, according to film historian Karen Ward Mahr, it was actually Margaret Edwards who did so in Hypocrites, which was released earlier in 1915.

Munson's second film, Purity (1916), made by the American Film Company in Santa Barbara, California and directed by Rae Berger, is the only one of her films to survive, being rediscovered in 1993 in a "pornography" collection in France and acquired by the French national cinema archive. Her third film, The Girl o' Dreams, also made by American in Santa Barbara and probably directed by Tom Ricketts from a story by William Pigott (the American Film Institute catalog lists Pigott as director, but all his other credits list him as a writer), was completed by the fall of 1916, but although the film is mentioned on the credit lists of several of its actors in the October 21, 1916 Motion Picture Studio Directory it was not released at that time and was not even copyrighted until December 31, 1918; there is no subsequent mention of the film and it may never have been released.

Munson returned to the East Coast by train via Syracuse in December 1916, having been involved with high society in New York and Newport, Rhode Island. There are accounts where her mother insists she married the son of a "Comstock Lode" silver heir,  Hermann Oelrichs Jr., then the richest bachelor in America. There is no record of this. On January 27, 1919, she wrote a rambling letter to the U.S. State Department denouncing Oelrichs as part of a pro-German network that had driven her out of the movie business. She said she planned to abandon the United States to restart her movie career in England.

Notoriety 

In 1919 Audrey Munson was living with her mother in a boarding house at 164 West 65th Street, Manhattan, owned by Dr. Walter Wilkins. Wilkins fell in love with Munson, and on February 27 murdered his wife, Julia, so he could be available for marriage. Munson and her mother left New York, and the police sought them for questioning. After a nationwide hunt, they were located. They refused to return to New York, but were questioned by agents from the Burns Detective Agency in Toronto, Ontario, Canada. The contents of the affidavits they supplied have never been revealed, but Audrey Munson strongly denied she had any romantic relationship with Dr. Wilkins. Wilkins was tried, found guilty, and sentenced to the electric chair. He hanged himself in his prison cell before the sentence could be carried out.

As a direct consequence or not, the Wilkins killing marked the end of Munson's modeling career. She continued to seek regular newspaper coverage. By 1920 Munson, unable to find work anywhere, was reported as living in Syracuse, New York, supported by her mother, who sold kitchen utensils door to door. In November 1920 she was said to be working as a ticket-taker in a dime museum.

From January through May 1921 a series of twenty serialized articles ran in Hearst's Sunday Magazine in dozens of Sunday newspaper supplements, under Munson's name, the whole series entitled By the 'Queen of the Artists' Studios'. The twenty articles relate anecdotes from her career, with warnings about the fates of other models. In one she asked the reader to imagine her future:

In February that year, agent-producer Allen Rock took out advertisements showing a $27,500 check he said he had paid Munson to star in a fourth film titled Heedless Moths, directed by Robert Z. Leonard from his own screenplay based on these writings. She later said the $27,500 check was just a "publicity stunt," and she filed suit against Allen Rock. Those proceedings revealed that the twenty articles had been ghostwritten by journalist Henry Leyford Gates.

In the summer of 1921 Munson conducted a nationwide search, carried by the United Press, for the perfect man to marry.  She ended the search in August claiming she didn't want to get married anyway. On October 3, 1921 she was arrested at the Royal Theater (later the Towne Theater) in St. Louis on a morals charge related to her personal appearance with the film Innocence (the reissue title of Purity), in which she had a leading role. She and her manager, independent film producer Ben Judell, were both acquitted.  Weeks later she was still appearing in St. Louis, along with screenings of Innocence, enacting "a series of new poses from famous paintings".

On May 27, 1922, Munson attempted suicide by swallowing a solution of bichloride of mercury.

Later life and death 
On June 8, 1931, her mother petitioned a judge to commit her to a mental asylum. The Oswego County judge ordered Munson be admitted into a psychiatric facility for treatment on her 40th birthday. She remained in the St. Lawrence State Hospital for the Insane in Ogdensburg, where she was treated for depression and schizophrenia, for 65 years, until her death at the age of 104. During her stay at the institution, she would often take care of her beauty with milk, yogurt and urine.

In the mid-1950s Munson was sufficiently famous to serve as the subject of an anecdote in a memoir that P.G. Wodehouse and Guy Bolton wrote of their years on Broadway, Bring on the Girls! (1953), though that memoir is considered more fiction than fact by Wodehouse's biographer.

She had no visitors at the asylum for over 25 years after her mother died in 1958, but she was rediscovered there by a half-niece, Darlene Bradley, in 1984, when Munson was 93. In the mid-1980s, Munson, in her mid-90s, was moved to a nursing home in Massena, New York, as the original hospital closed, however, she would often escape to a nearby bar, with employees in the nursing home having to find her. As a result, she was moved back to the new mental institution. By the time she turned 100, she had no teeth and lost much of her hearing but was otherwise in good health. Shortly after her 100th birthday, Munson broke a hip. Munson died on February 20, 1996, at the age of 104. She was buried at New Haven Cemetery in New Haven, New York and she received a headstone on her grave on June 8, 2016, 20 years after her death and on what would have been her 125th birthday.

Sculptures of Munson

This table is organized by sculptor and date. She posed for most of the sculptors who created architectural and fountain sculptures for the 1915 Panama-Pacific International Exposition, and for other sculptors who exhibited there.

Coverage of Munson's career contained inaccuracies during her lifetime, and errors about the works for which she modeled have been perpetuated. Munson herself was inconsistent about her age and other matters. For example, a June 1915 article listed the 24-year-old Munson's age as 18, and an August 1915 press release claimed that she started posing at age 14 which would have been four years prior to her first known modeling credit, for Konti's Three Graces group at the Hotel Astor, unveiled to the public in September 1909 when she was 18.

Filmography

All four films in which Munson appeared were thought to have been lost, until a copy of Purity (1916) was recovered in France in 2009.

In 2010, film director Roberto Serrini made a documentary about Munson which was featured in several news outlets including the New York Post.

References
Informational notes

Citations

Bibliography
Bone, James (2016) The Curse of Beauty: The Scandalous & Tragic Life of Audrey Munson, America's First Supermodel. New York: Regan Arts. 
Donnelly, Elisabeth (Summer 2015) "Descending Night", The Believer, v.13 n.2.
Mullgardt, Louis Christian (1915) The Architecture and Landscape Gardening of the Exposition – A Pictorial Survey of the Most Beautiful of the Compositions of the Panama-Pacific International Exposition. San Francisco: Paul Elder and Company.
Neuhaus, Eugen (1915) The Art of the Exposition – Personal Impressions of the Architecture, Sculpture, Mural Decorations, Color Scheme & Other Aesthetic Aspects of the Panama-Pacific International Exposition. San Francisco: Paul Elder and Company.
Rozas, Diane & Gottehrer, Anita Bourne (1999) American Venus: The Extraordinary Life of Audrey Munson, Model and Muse. Los Angeles: Balcony Press.

External links

 
 
 Blog devoted to Munson in NYC
 The Audrey Munson Project
 Audrey Munson, J. Willis Sayre Photographs Collection, University of Washington
 Portrait photo, 1922, The New York Times, December 9, 2007
 "America's first supermodel", BBC News, May 31, 2016; video with images: photos, film, sculpture
 "Miss Manhattan", 99% invisible, February 15, 2016, Podcast, video, images
 

1891 births
1996 deaths
American people of Irish descent
20th-century American actresses
American artists' models
American centenarians
American child models
Female models from New York (state)
American silent film actresses
American stage actresses
Burials in New York (state)
Actresses from Rochester, New York
People with mood disorders
People with schizophrenia
Women centenarians
Muses